Sheila Chesed de Almeida Mello (born July 23, 1978) is a Brazilian dancer, actress and model. She became famous for dancing in the band É o Tchan!

Biography 
Sheila was born in Cidade Ademar, a district on the outskirts of São Paulo. Before becoming known for her participation in the group É o Tchan!, She graduated in both classical ballet and in modern ballet.

Her entry to the group É o Tchan! came in 1998 through a contest held to choose a replacement for the dancer Carla Perez who left the group. Immediately after her victory she posed nude for the first time in Playboy magazine. She was on the cover in the other two editions, one next to Scheila Carvalho, her colleague É o Tchan!. In October 2007, she posed naked again, this time for the magazine Sexy.

In 2009, she participated of the second season of the Brazilian reality show, A Fazenda. During the competition, she came to know her future husband, the former swimmer Fernando Scherer. They married on July 24, 2010. In August 2018, Mello announced her separation from Scherer.

Movies 
 2007: Alphaville 2007 d.C
 2007: Segurança Nacional

Theater 
 Herótica - Cartilha Feminina Para Homens Machos (direction: Darson Ribeiro)
 Caldé e os Peixes Que Aprendem a Nadar no Ar (direction: Marcelo Lazzaratti)
 Gretta Garbo Quem Diria, Acabou no Irajá (direction: Hilton Have)
 O Santo e a Porca (direction: Ednaldo Freire)
 Viúva, Porém Honesta (direction: Fábio Marcof)
 A Invasão (direction: Gabriel Carmona)
 Caminhos da Independência
 Uma Empregada Quase Perfeita (direction: Mirian Lins)
 2/4 no Motel (direction: Flávio Colatrello)

Television 
 2009: A Fazenda 2

References

External links 

 
 Biografia de Sheila Mello

1978 births
Living people
Actresses from São Paulo
Brazilian people of Arab descent
Brazilian people of Portuguese descent
Brazilian female dancers
Brazilian television presenters
Brazilian female models
The Farm (TV series) contestants
Brazilian women television presenters